Lemuel Dale Evans (January 8, 1810 – July 1, 1877) was a U.S. Representative from Texas.

Born in Tennessee, Evans studied law and was admitted to the bar. He moved to Marshall, Texas, in 1843 and engaged in the practice of law. He served as member of the State convention that annexed the State of Texas to the Union in 1845.

Evans was elected as the candidate of the American Party to the Thirty-fourth Congress (March 4, 1855 – March 3, 1857). He was an unsuccessful candidate for reelection in 1856 to the Thirty-fifth Congress. He served as collector of internal revenue in 1867. He served as member of the reconstruction convention in 1868 and as chief justice of the supreme court in 1870 and 1871. He served as associate justice and presiding judge from 1872 to 1873, when he resigned. In 1875, he was the United States marshal for the eastern judicial district of Texas. He died in Washington, D.C., on July 1, 1877. He was interred in the Congressional Cemetery.

Sources

1810 births
1877 deaths
Members of the United States House of Representatives from Texas
Burials at the Congressional Cemetery
Texas Know Nothings
United States Marshals
Know-Nothing members of the United States House of Representatives from Texas
Chief Justices of the Texas Supreme Court
19th-century American politicians
19th-century American judges